The Strausberg Railway is a light railway serving the town of Strausberg in Brandenburg, Germany. It links central Strausberg with the Strausberg railway station, where it connects with trains on the Berlin S-Bahn and the Niederbarnimer Eisenbahn. Although formally constituted and regulated as a railway, the line uses tramway style rolling stock and is superficially indistinguishable from a tramway.

Overview
The railway is operated by the company . This company also operates the Straussee Ferry, an unusual electrically operated passenger cable ferry that crosses the Straussee lake from a landing close to the railway's Strausberg terminus.

History
The railway was originally opened in 1893, at which time it was operated by steam locomotives and carried both freight and passenger traffic. In 1921 the line was electrified, and a new street based routing opened for the final  length into Strausberg. The originally routing remained open for freight traffic and was also electrified. In 1926, the line was extended from Lustgarten to Jugendheim, but this section closed in 1970. Freight traffic ceased in 2005, and the original routing was closed, along with the rail connection to the main line network.

From south to north, the line serves stops at Strausberg railway station, Landhausstraße, Schlagmühle, Stadtwald, Hegermühle, Wolfstal, Käthe-Kollwitz-Straße, Elisabethstraße and Lustgarten. The depot is situated on the original route, and is accessed by a curve just beyond the Lustgarten terminus.

The line had been mainly operated by three ČKD Tatra KT8D5 tram cars, built in 1989/1990 and acquired from Košice in 1995. A prototype ČKD Tatra T6C5 car, built in 1998 as a demonstrator for the United States market and operated on the New Orleans streetcar system for several months, had been acquired from Siemens (the new owners of Tatra) in 2003 and had been used in off-peak service. Two older Reko-Triebwagen TZ 69 cars, built in 1969 and acquired in the 1980s, were still available for passenger service, and a third had been converted into a works car. The railway also owns an even older preserved passenger car, dating from 1925.

The Strausberg Railway joined the delivery framework of the BVG Berlin Transport Company ordering 2 Flexity Berlin trams on  5. September 2011.  The two short double-sided two-cab trams were delivered in February and March 2013 replacing its older trams in daily service.

Photogallery

See also
Straussee Ferry
Strausberg station
Berlin Tramway
Potsdam Tramway

Notes

References

External links

 

Railway
Tram transport in Germany
Transport in Brandenburg
Rail transport in Berlin
Railway